Echium candicans, the pride of Madeira, is a species of flowering plant in the family Boraginaceae, native to the island of Madeira.

In the first year after germination the plant produces a broad rosette of leaves. In the second and subsequent years more or less woody flowering stalks are produced clothed in rough leaves. The flower head is large and covered with white or blue flowers having red stamens. It is much visited by bees and butterflies for its nectar.

Etymology
The Latin specific epithet candicans means “shining white”, referring to one colour form of this species.

Cultivation
Echium candicans is cultivated in the horticulture trade and widely available throughout the world as an ornamental plant for traditional and drought tolerant water conserving gardens. It is particularly suitable for coastal planting. It has gained the Royal Horticultural Society's Award of Garden Merit.

Invasive species
In California, it is an invasive species. It is removed from native plant communities as part of habitat restoration efforts in coastal parks such as the Golden Gate National Recreation Area.

In New Zealand it is a common garden escapee onto road-side verges and shingle banks throughout the drier parts of both the North and the South Islands.

In the state of Victoria, Australia, it is considered to be a high weed risk and an alert has been posted by the Department of Primary Industries.

References

candicans
Flora of Madeira
Taxa named by Carl Linnaeus the Younger